The American electronic industrial rock band My Life with the Thrill Kill Kult has released ten studio albums, one live album, three compilation albums, two video albums, six remix albums, three extended plays, and ten singles. In addition, their songs have been featured on three soundtrack albums  and one promotional single for major Hollywood films.

They began their career on the independent record label Wax Trax! Records, which, like the band, was based in Chicago. In 1991, their single "Sexplosion!" from the album of the same name became a top 10 dance club hit in the U.S. Following this success, Thrill Kill Kult was signed by the major label Interscope Records, which re-released the Sexplosion! album. On Interscope, the band achieved their biggest hit, "Sex On Wheelz", which reached the top 20 on both the dance club and alternative U.S. charts.

The band's 1993 Interscope album 13 Above the Night was their only album to chart, reaching #194 on the Billboard top 200 albums chart. The album provided two more dance chart hits, "Blue Buddha"  and "Final Blindness". After one more Interscope album, Thrill Kill Kult briefly moved to Red Ant Records in the late 1990s.  Their releases since 2000 have been on Rykodisc and/or the band's own label, Sleazebox Records. 
 
Thrill Kill Kult's songs have also been featured (along with other artists) on three soundtrack albums for the films Cool World (1992), The Crow (1994), and Showgirls (1995), as well as a promo-only single for the film The Flintstones (1994).

Studio albums
The following table is a summary of My Life with the Thrill Kill Kult's studio albums.

Remix albums
{| class="wikitable"
|-
!Year
!Title
!Record Label
!Notes
|-
|1999
|Dirty Little Secrets: music to STRIP by...
|Rykodisc
|
|-
|2002
|Golden Pillz: The Luna Remixes
|SleazeBox Records
|
|-
|2004
|Diamonds & Daggerz
|Rykodisc
| Contains both new and classic songs extensively reworked and remixed into one continuous mix.
|-
|2005
|My Life Remixed: A Remix Tribute to My Life with the Thrill Kill Kult
|Red Ant Records
|Contains remixes by other artists.
|-
|2007
|Blood + Dope + Sin + Gold
|SleazeBox Records
|This CD was only available at the merchandise booth on the 2007 tour. It features remixes from The Filthiest Show in Town, Gay, Black and Married, and The Reincarnation of Luna.
|-
|2010
|Sinister Whisperz - Volume One: The "Wax Trax" Years (1987–1991)
|SleazeBox Records, Rustblade (Europe)
| This CD contains remixes of songs from the Wax Trax! years (1987–1991).
|-
|2016
|Sinister Whisperz II: The Interscope Years (1992–1996)|SleazeBox Records
| This CD contains remixes of songs from the Interscope years (1992–1996).
|-
|2020
|Sinister Whisperz III: The Rykodisc Years|SleazeBox Records
| This CD contains remixes of songs from the Rykodisc years.
|-
|2021
|Sleazy action|SleazeBox Records
| This CD contains a compilation of 12 previously unreleased remixes by TKK's Buzz McCoy, including tracks from related side-project Bomb Gang Girlzand new songs by Buzz McCoy and Groovie Mann’s Darling Kandie.
|-
|}

Live albums

Compilation albums

Extended plays

Singles

Video albums

Soundtracks
 Cool World featured the songs "Sex on Wheelz" and "Her Sassy Kiss" (1992).  The film itself contained three other Thrill Kill Kult songs: "The Devil Does Drugs", "Sedusa", and "Holli's Groove". "Holli's Groove" was retitled "Strippers Only" and featured on the album Dirty Little Secrets. "Sedusa" was retitled "The Smash-Up" and appeared as a bonus track on a later compilation simply titled "My Life with the Thrill Kill Kult."
 The Crow featured the exclusive song "After the Flesh" (1994), which is a re-working of the earlier track "Nervous Xians". The band is also featured briefly in the movie performing live.
 The Flintstones (1994) featured a different version of the song "Hit & Run Holiday". A one-track promo only single was released featuring this version of the song.
 Showgirls (1995) featured two original songs, "Wasted Time" and "Someone New". The song "The Devil Does Drugs" also appears in the film, but not on the soundtrack album. Another track called "Seduction 23" was composed for the film, but swapped with "Wasted Time" near completion of the movie.
 BASEketball featured the songs "Golden Strip", "Glamour Is a Rocky Road", and "Hot Blood Risin'", but they were not on the soundtrack.
 Beavis and Butthead featured the main characters watching the video to the song "Blue Buddah"
 The Suicide Girls DVD The First Tour featured the song "Hour of Zero (Don't Mess with Illinoize Remix)"
 CSI: NY Episode 52 Season 3 "Oedipus Hex" - Guest appearance by Suicide Girls, featured the song "Hour of Zero (Don't Mess with Illinoize Remix)"
 So You Think You Can Dance Fox TV: air date 7/21/2010 - featured the song "Wasted Time"
 The Amityville Legacy (2016) featured "Spooky Tricks" in the film, but not on the official soundtrack.
 Nemesis 5: The New Model (2018) featured the Bomb Gang Girlz'' song "Want" in the film, but not on the official soundtrack.

References

Rock music group discographies